Thomas Vancaeyezeele (born 27 July 1994) is a French Guianan footballer who plays as a defender for the French Guiana national team.

Career

Youth and college
Vancaeyezeele played for the youth sides of Stade Malherbe Caen of Ligue 1. For the 2011–12 season he was promoted to the reserve side, making one appearance in the Championnat National 2. For the 2013–14 season, he transferred to Hérouvillais of the Championnat National 3. During the season he made 21 appearances, scoring a single goal. In February 2015, he signed on for a stint with CD Vitoria of Spain's Fifth Division. He made his debut for the club on 23 February against CD El Pilar Marianistas.

In 2015, Vancaeyezeele traveled to the United States to play college soccer for the Charleston Golden Eagles of the University of Charleston. Over his two season with the club, he made 41 appearances, scoring five goals. The team won the school's first NCAA Division II Championship during the 2017 season, defeating the Lynn Fighting Knights 3–1 in the final. Following the match, Vancaeyezeele was named the NCAA Division II Player of the Year, in addition to several other accolades.

Semi-professional
In 2016, Vancaeyezeele played club football for the SW Florida Adrenaline of the semi-professional Premier Development League. Over the course of the season, he made ten regular season appearances, scoring one goal. For the 2017 season, Vancaeyezeele moved to the Mississippi Brilla, also of the PDL. During the season, he made 14 regular season appearances, scoring two goals, and a further three appearances in the playoffs.

Professional
After graduation from the University of Charleston, Vancaeyezeele was invited to participate in the 2018 Major League Soccer Combine. However, he was not selected in the 2018 MLS SuperDraft, despite being projected as a potential early pick.

In March 2018, Vancaeyezeele went on trial with Pittsburgh Riverhounds SC of the United Soccer League, the second tier of the United States soccer league system. He made two preseason appearances for the team, including one against league rivals Penn FC in which he set up Romeo Parkes's game-winning goal. On 14 March 2018, he was signed to a one-year contract with a club option for an additional year. He made his professional debut in the opening match of the 2018 season, a 0–0 draw at Nashville SC in which he started and played the full 90 minutes. Over the first two matches of the season, Vancaeyezeele maintained the team's highest passing percentage in the offensive half and the team lead in interceptions.

Vancaeyezeele scored his first professional goal on 20 April 2018, Pittsburgh's second goal of a 2–2 draw away at FC Cincinnati. He was then named to the USL Team of the Week for the first time for his performance in the match. Vancaeyezeele scored his first U.S. Open Cup goal in a 2–1 victory over Erie Commodores FC on 16 May 2018.

During his first season with the club, he made a team-high 32 starts, scoring two league goals. On 7 December 2018 it was announced that Vancaeyezeele had signed a one-year extension with the team with a club option for an additional year.

On 12 December 2020, Vancaeyezeele moved to USL Championship side San Diego Loyal ahead of the 2021 season. On July 8, 2021 he switched to fellow USL Championship club Birmingham Legion.

On May 26, 2022, the Tampa Bay Rowdies announced that they had acquired Vancaeyezeele from Birmingham Legion for an international slot and an undisclosed fee. He was released by Tampa following their 2022 season.

International career
Vancaeyezeele was called up to by French Guiana for the first time in September 2019 for 2019–20 CONCACAF Nations League B matches against Belize and St. Kitts and Nevis. He qualifies to represent the nation through family ties. After French Guiana was awarded a 3–0 victory over Belize when the visitors did not arrive in time for the match, Vancaeyezeele made his debut, starting and playing the full match, in the eventual 2–2 draw with St. Kitts and Nevis.

Career statistics

Club

International

References

External links

Pittsburgh Riverhounds profile
PDL profile
National Football Teams profile

Living people
1994 births
French Guianan footballers
French people of French Guianan descent
French footballers
Footballers from Caen
Association football midfielders
University of Charleston alumni
Stade Malherbe Caen players
CD Vitoria footballers
Mississippi Brilla players
Pittsburgh Riverhounds SC players
San Diego Loyal SC players
Birmingham Legion FC players
Championnat National 2 players
Championnat National 3 players
Divisiones Regionales de Fútbol players
USL League Two players
USL Championship players
French Guiana international footballers
French Guianan expatriate footballers
Expatriate footballers in Spain
Expatriate soccer players in the United States